Andrew Charles Lang Jr. (born June 28, 1966) is a retired American professional basketball player who played twelve seasons in the National Basketball Association (NBA). He played college basketball for the Arkansas Razorbacks.

Career

After a four-year career at the University of Arkansas, Lang was selected by the Phoenix Suns in the second round (28th pick overall) of the 1988 NBA draft.  He quickly developed a reputation as a proficient shotblocker. For years, he maintained the fourth all-time NBA record of one blocked shot every 9.12 minutes.

After starting a career-high 71 games while recording career-highs of 6.7 rebounds and 2.5 blocks per game in 1992, Lang was traded (along with Jeff Hornacek and Tim Perry) to the Philadelphia 76ers for All-Star forward Charles Barkley.

Somewhat of a journeyman center, he also played for the Atlanta Hawks, Minnesota Timberwolves, Milwaukee Bucks, Chicago Bulls and New York Knicks before retiring in 2000.  He finished his career averaging 6.0 points, 4.8 rebounds and 1.5 blocked shots per game.

Lang is the 55th all-time leading shot blocker in NBA history.

While on the Bucks, Lang received attention for a 1997 incident at the Bradley Center in Milwaukee, involving him fouling Knicks star center Patrick Ewing. After a midair collision with Lang, Ewing fell on his wrist and the Bucks went on to win the game, while Ewing did not return until the second round of the playoffs. Ewing never again regained his All-Star form after that injury. Lang later signed with the Knicks to be Ewing's backup at the center position.

Personal life

Lang is a Christian evangelist and is currently employed by the Atlanta Hawks as the team chaplain.  Lang lives in Marietta, Georgia with his wife, Bronwyn.  His son Trey played college basketball for the UMass Minutemen.   His other son, Chad, played college basketball for the Belmont Bruins and the Lipscomb Bisons.

NBA career statistics

Regular season

|-
| align="left" | 1988–89
| align="left" | Phoenix
| 62 || 25 || 8.5 || .513 || .000 || .650 || 2.4 || 0.1 || 0.3 || 0.8 || 2.6
|-
| align="left" | 1989–90
| align="left" | Phoenix
| 74 || 0 || 13.7 || .557 || .000 || .653 || 3.7 || 0.3 || 0.3 || 1.8 || 3.5
|-
| align="left" | 1990–91
| align="left" | Phoenix
| 63 || 18 || 18.3 || .577 || .000 || .715 || 4.8 || 0.4 || 0.3 || 2.0 || 4.9
|-
| align="left" | 1991–92
| align="left" | Phoenix
| 81 || 71 || 24.3 || .522 || .000 || .768 || 6.7 || 0.5 || 0.6 || 2.5 || 7.7
|-
| align="left" | 1992–93
| align="left" | Philadelphia
| 73 || 59 || 25.5 || .425 || .200 || .763 || 6.0 || 1.1 || 0.6 || 1.9 || 5.3
|-
| align="left" | 1993–94
| align="left" | Atlanta
| style="background:#cfecec;"| 82* || 0 || 19.6 || .469 || .250 || .689 || 3.8 || 0.6 || 0.5 || 1.1 || 6.1
|-
| align="left" | 1994–95
| align="left" | Atlanta
| style="background:#cfecec;"| 82* || 63 || 28.5 || .473 || .667 || .809 || 5.6 || 0.9 || 0.5 || 1.8 || 9.7
|-
| align="left" | 1995–96
| align="left" | Atlanta
| 51 || 51 || 35.6 || .454 || .000 || .805 || 6.5 || 1.2 || 0.7 || 1.7 || 12.9
|-
| align="left" | 1995–96
| align="left" | Minnesota
| 20 || 18 || 27.5 || .421 || .500 || .789 || 6.1 || 0.2 || 0.4 || 2.1 || 8.8
|-
| align="left" | 1996–97
| align="left" | Milwaukee
| 52 || 52 || 23.0 || .464 || .000 || .721 || 5.3 || 0.5 || 0.5 || 0.9 || 5.3
|-
| align="left" | 1997–98
| align="left" | Milwaukee
| 57 || 0 || 12.1 || .378 || .000 || .772 || 2.7 || 0.3 || 0.3 || 0.5 || 2.7
|-
| align="left" | 1997–98
| align="left" | Milwaukee
| 57 || 0 || 12.1 || .378 || .000 || .772 || 2.7 || 0.3 || 0.3 || 0.5 || 2.7
|-
| align="left" | 1998–99
| align="left" | Chicago
| 21 || 13 || 18.4 || .323 || .000 || .696 || 4.4 || 0.6 || 0.2 || 0.6 || 3.8
|-
| align="left" | 1999–00
| align="left" | New York
| 19 || 10 || 12.8 || .438 || .000 || .429 || 3.2 || 0.2 || 0.4 || 0.3 || 3.1
|- class="sortbottom"
| style="text-align:center;" colspan="2"| Career
| 737 || 380 || 20.8 || .470 || .250 || .744 || 4.8 || 0.6 || 0.5 || 1.5 || 6.0
|}

Playoffs

|-
| align="left" | 1988–89
| align="left" | Phoenix
| 4 || 0 || 2.0 || .000 || .000 || .000 || 1.5 || 0.3 || 0.0 || 0.0 || 0.0
|-
| align="left" | 1989–90
| align="left" | Phoenix
| 12 || 0 || 7.8 || .667 || .000 || .571 || 1.7 || 0.2 || 0.3 || 0.8 || 1.3
|-
| align="left" | 1990–91
| align="left" | Phoenix
| 4 || 0 || 13.8 || .545 || .000 || .824 || 4.5 || 0.3 || 0.3 || 0.8 || 6.5
|-
| align="left" | 1991–92
| align="left" | Phoenix
| 8 || 8 || 24.0 || .375 || .000 || .789 || 4.0 || 0.3 || 0.4 || 1.9 || 5.6
|-
| align="left" | 1993–94
| align="left" | Atlanta
| 11 || 0 || 21.3 || .460 || .000 || .773 || 4.3 || 0.5 || 0.5 || 1.8 || 6.8
|-
| align="left" | 1994–95
| align="left" | Atlanta
| 3 || 3 || 33.7 || .429 || .000 || .778 || 4.0 || 0.3 || 0.7 || 0.7 || 10.3
|- class="sortbottom"
| style="text-align:center;" colspan="2"| Career
| 42 || 11 || 16.3 || .444 || .000 || .770 || 3.2 || 0.3 || 0.4 || 1.2 || 4.6
|}

References

External links
Catching up with Andrew Lang
Andrew Lang's Basketball-Reference.com Bio Page

1966 births
Living people
African-American basketball players
American evangelists
American men's basketball players
Arkansas Razorbacks men's basketball players
Atlanta Hawks players
Basketball players from Arkansas
Centers (basketball)
Chicago Bulls players
McDonald's High School All-Americans
Milwaukee Bucks players
Minnesota Timberwolves players
New York Knicks players
Philadelphia 76ers players
Phoenix Suns draft picks
Phoenix Suns players
Sportspeople from Pine Bluff, Arkansas
21st-century African-American people
20th-century African-American sportspeople